Cerian Gibbes (born 25 September 1982) is a Trinidad and Tobago swimmer. She competed in two events at the 1996 Summer Olympics.

References

1982 births
Living people
Trinidad and Tobago female swimmers
Olympic swimmers of Trinidad and Tobago
Swimmers at the 1996 Summer Olympics
Place of birth missing (living people)